The "filaments evaluation protocol" (FEP) is a protocol developed to establish the characteristics and qualities of materials used in FDM/FFF 3D printing.

Purpose 
The protocol, designed in 2014 by Dogma Solutions, is not applied to measure the properties of materials, but is instead designed to determine their suitability to specific uses and applications.

For this reason, the evaluations performed during the test does not provide quantitative outputs, but rather indicate, for each tested parameter, a degree of judgment on a unipolar odd Likert scale (by now known as "Degree of Likert Rating" or "DLR"):

References

3D printing